Linying (born 1 October 1994) is a Singaporean singer-songwriter. She recently signed on a multi-rights deal with Universal Music Singapore, becoming the first Singapore female artist to do so, and Canadian music label Nettwerk Music Group. She has collaborated with Felix Jaehn and KRONO, and has received special praise from Troye Sivan for her vocals. Linying also collaborated with Sezairi, Shye and Shabir on the National Day Parade 2021 Theme Song, "The Road Ahead", selected for the song's significance in the adversities caused by the ongoing COVID-19 pandemic on Singapore.

Discography

Singles 
 "Sticky Leaves" (2016)
 "Alpine" (2016)
 "Paris 12" (2016)
 "Tall Order" (2018)
 "Paycheck" (2018)
 "All of Our Friends Know" (2019)
 "Good Behaviour" (2021)

Extended plays 
 Paris 12 (2016)

References 

1994 births
Living people
21st-century Singaporean women singers
Singaporean composers
Singaporean people of Chinese descent
Singaporean singer-songwriters